The translation of Han dynasty government titles into English varies within the academic community. This page is a reference to compare renderings of Chinese official titles by different sinologists.

History 
The first specialist reference for the English renderings of Chinese official titles was written in 1878 by a British legate to the Chinese government in Beijing, William Frederick Mayers. The most common terms used today in translation of official titles date back to Homer H. Dubs's translation of the Book of Han and Book of the Later Han from 1938 to 1955.

Dubs's translation lacked a published glossary of titles, but a list of titles used by Dubs was compiled by Rafe de Crespigny and published in 1967. In the interim, Wang Yuquan (王毓銓) published An Outline of the Central Government of the Former Han Dynasty in 1949. The next major systematising work on Han dynasty government was The Bureaucracy of Han Times written by Hans Bielenstein in 1980, drawing upon Dubs's and de Crespigny's work as its major source of translation for titles.

In 1985, Charles Hucker completed his Dictionary of Official Titles of Imperial China, a collection of nearly 8,300 titles and government offices and associated translations for every dynasty from the Zhou to the Qing, the most complete specialist literature of its type. During the 1980s and 1990s another list of proposed translation for Han dynasty titles was circulating in the University of Washington, where Jack Dull headed the Han Dynasty Project. Long after Dull's death, this list was made available as part of his collection of unpublished papers, available online from University of Oregon. Dull's list of Official Titles of the Han Dynasty also mainly follows Dubs.

Two comprehensive biographical dictionaries have also added to these reference aids: Michael Loewe's 2000 Biographical Dictionary of Qin, Former Han, and Xin Periods, and Rafe de Crespigny's 2007 Biographical Dictionary of Later Han to the Three Kingdoms, both published by Brill and intended to complement each other. De Crespigny's translation of titles mainly follow Dubs with some alterations, whereas Loewe's tend to be his own original renderings.

In 2007 Rafe de Crespigny published online a collection of his papers, among them An Outline of the Military Organisation of the Later Han Empire and An Outline of the Civil Administration of the Later Han Empire. Each of these includes an appendix listing a number of titles along with the translation de Crespigny has adopted, which he calls "slightly modified, varying from the system established by H.H. Dubs...".

Schema for Han dynasty titles

The Dubs school 
The Dubs school of title translation has the longest pedigree of any schema for title translation and has broad acceptance in the scholarly community, but it was not built on any unifying principles and changed erratically during Dubs's lifetime. It is now mainly represented by the works of Bielenstein, de Crespigny, and Dull, all of whom made their own minor alterations while trying to remain mostly in the Dubs framework.

Wang Yuquan's 1949 article, although based entirely on primary source materials, seems to draw inspiration for translation of titles from Dubs in places, and can be considered to be completely superseded by later works. It was a source for Bielenstein, who called it "out of date". Bielenstein remains the academic standard which all others attempt to improve but compare themselves against for context. Dull's work, unpublished until it was released freely on the web in 2010, has been ignored by academia. De Crespigny has gone further outside the Dubs mold than the other authors.

In a 1971 review of de Crespigny's 1969 translation of part of the Zizhi Tongjian, Han dynasty specialist Anthony Hulsewé impugned the renderings of Chinese official titles, which then much more closely followed Dubs, as "barbarized" and "abhorrent".

The Hucker system 
Hucker's system has, in the main, not been adopted by the scholarly community. Its strengths are that it was created with a goal of systematisation and universality, and built upon sound principles of translation: that the rendering should ideally convey both the sense of the responsibilities of the office and the literal Chinese meaning, that it should avoid too-familiar Western analogues likely to create false impressions, and that it should not rely on bizarre-sounding neologisms. Hucker drew from a great deal of references during his research, including the work of Bielenstein, and received input from a large number of Chinese scholars, including de Crespigny and Dull.

In An Outline of the Civil Administration of the Later Han Empire, Rafe de Crespigny rejects outright Hucker's system, claiming he found Hucker's renderings to be unreliable and unacceptable for the Han period.

Loewe 
The titles adopted by Loewe in his Biographical Dictionary largely follow the translations as they appeared in The Cambridge History of China, volume 1 (1987), which Loewe helped to edit. He shies away from more literal translations, opting instead for renderings which "indicate an official's responsibilities, or his place in the organs of government, where possible in immediately meaningful terms; and in so far as imperial offices were organised in a hierarchical basis, it has been thought advisable to choose terms which convey an official's degree of seniority." Loewe appends a table comparing the renderings he adopts to those used by "Dubs, Bielenstein, and de Crespigny", acknowledging their grouping as a single school and that school's sinological primacy.

Difficulties 
Several difficulties exist in providing a unified one-to-one translation for Han dynasty titles, these may range from each scholar's personal preferences to more profound issues.

One main point of contention is whether the translation should follow the literal meaning of the title or to describe the roles of that title's holder. As the Chinese bureaucracy developed, the responsibilities of an office changed and the names of positions changed, not necessarily at the same time. An office from the Zhou dynasty might share the same title as an office from the Qing dynasty, but with completely different powers, scope, and responsibilities.

Not every scholar covers every era. While Hucker's system is meant to detail government offices since the Zhou dynasty, the Dubs School focuses on the Han dynasty, and to a lesser extent the Qin dynasty and Three Kingdoms period. De Crespigny is an expert on the Later Han dynasty and Three Kingdoms; Loewe is an expert on the Former Han and Xin dynasties. A valid translation for one dynasty may not be valid for another.

Comparisons
Here is a table of comparisons between Han dynasty Chinese official titles and five sources of renderings, ordered by pinyin.

References

Citations

Sources 
 
 
 
 
 
 
 
 
 
 
 
 

Government of Imperial China
Han dynasty
Sinology
Translations into English